Joyce Irene Garrett (March 2, 1945 – February 11, 1993) was an American actress and vocalist. She is best known for her role on Days of Our Lives as Jo Johnson between 1987 and 1993.

In addition to her work in film and television, Garrett did some stage acting. She performed in three productions at La MaMa Experimental Theatre Club during the 1970s. These were Paul Foster's Silver Queen directed by Robert Patrick (1973), The King's Crown and I (1974), and Paul Foster's Silver Queen Saloon directed by Pat Carmichael (1978).

Garrett died of liver failure at the age of 47 in 1993.

Select filmography
 Star Trek: The Next Generation (1992)
 Murder, She Wrote (1990)
 Days of Our Lives as Jo Johnson (1987–1993)
 Love Among Thieves (1987) as Hooker
 Dynasty (1987)
 Sidekicks
 Night Court
 Magnum, P.I.
 Remington Steele
 The Young and the Restless 
 Alice
 Archie Bunker's Place
 The Dukes of Hazzard as Billie Tucker
 Hotline (1982)
 Too Close for Comfort (1983)
 Born to Be Sold (1981) 
 Benson (1980)
 The Incredible Hulk (1978) as Tina
 Husbands, Wives & Lovers (1978)
 Quincy M.E. (1978)
 Charlie's Angels (1978)

References

External links
Garrett's page on La MaMa Archives Digital Collections

 
 Joy Garrett at Internet Off-Broadway Database

1945 births
1993 deaths
American film actresses
American soap opera actresses
Actresses from Texas
American beauty pageant winners
Singers from Texas
People from Fort Worth, Texas
20th-century American actresses
20th-century American singers
Deaths from liver failure
20th-century American women singers
21st-century American women